Alexandru Penciu (born 1 November 1932 in Bucharest) is a Romanian former rugby union player and coach, who played as a fullback or centre. Amongst the best players of all time, he was nicknamed "Alexander the Great" (Alexandru cel Mare) in his home country.

Club career
Penciu started his rugby career after the Second World War with Petrolul București as a youth in 1947. In the same year he moved to Locomotiva PPT, where he played from 1947 to 1952, and was promoted to the first team in 1950.
He joined CCA, later called CSA Steaua București in 1952, where he would play until 1968. There he won five league titles and four Romanian Cups. 

In 1969, Penciu was allowed by the communist authorities to play abroad in Italy. Penciu was a player-coach for Italian side Rovigo. He scored the most points in the Serie A league in 1970-1971 (104 points) and 1971-1972 (124 points). 

He retired as a player, in 1973, at the age of 40.

International career
Penciu won 34 caps for Romania, from 1955 to 1967, and scoring 2 conversions, 7 penalties and 4 drop goals, 37 points in aggregate. He debuted on 20 April 1955 in Brno, in a 3–0 win over Czechoslovakia. In June 1960, he played in the first ever win of Romania over France, 11–5, where he scored 1 conversion and 2 drop goals. Romania was then experiencing its first "Golden Era" of rugby and was often considered the best European team outside the Five Nations Championship. 

His last international game was on 10 December 1967 in Nantes in the 11–3 defeat against France in the FIRA Nations Cup, where he scored a penalty. It was the second consecutive second-place finish for Romania in the competition, losing twice in a row the title to France, then the only continental European side at the Five Nations Championship.

Coaching career
After retiring as a player, he coached a number of clubs in Canada, France and Italy.

Honours

Club
Steaua Bucharest
Romanian League (5): 1953, 1954, 1961, 1963, 1964
Romanian Cup (4): 1953, 1955, 1956, 1958

International
Romania
FIRA Nations Cup runner-up: 1967

See also
 List of Romania national rugby union players

References

External links
 

1932 births
Living people
Rugby union players from Bucharest
Rugby union fullbacks
Rugby union centres
Romanian rugby union players
Romanian rugby union coaches
CSA Steaua București (rugby union) players
Rugby Rovigo Delta players
Romania international rugby union players
Romanian expatriate rugby union players
Expatriate rugby union players in Italy
Romanian expatriate sportspeople in Italy